classmates.com is a social networking service. It was founded on November 17, 1995 by Randy Conrads as Classmates Online, Inc.

It originally sought to help users find class members and colleagues from kindergarten, primary school, high school, college, workplaces, and the U.S. military. In 2010, CEO Mark Goldston described the transition of the website "to increasingly focus on nostalgic content" such as "high school yearbooks, movie trailers, music tracks, and photographic images". To this end, and to appeal more to older users, the website name was changed to Memory Lane, which included a website redesign. This change was short-lived, however. Classmates dropped the Memory Lane brand in 2011.

Corporate information
United Online, Inc. (Nasdaq: UNTD) acquired Classmates Online in 2004 and owned and operated the company as part of its Classmates Media Corporation subsidiary until 2015.

Classmates Media operated online social networking and loyalty marketing services under the Classmates.com and MyPoints brands, respectively.

Classmates Media also operated the following international sites designed to enable users to connect with old friends:
 StayFriends.de (Germany)
 StayFriends.se (Sweden)
 StayFriends.at (Austria)
 Trombi.com (France)
In May 2016, the StayFriends sites were sold to Ströer.

In August 2015, Classmates was acquired from United Online by PeopleConnect Holdings, Inc., a portfolio company of H.I.G. Capital, for $30 million. Classmates is now operated as a division of PeopleConnect, which also owns Intelius.

Classmates Media Corporation's business model is based on user-generated content and revenue from paid subscriptions and advertising sales.

Users and ranking among other social networking sites
The only time Classmates appeared on Hitwise's top 10 list of social networking websites was June 2009, when it appeared tenth with 0.45% market share.

In early 2008, Nielsen Online had ranked Classmates as number three in unique monthly visitors (U.S. home, work) among social networking sites.

As of June 30, 2008, Classmates Media had more than 50 million members, but only 3.8 million paying subscribers.

In 2006, television program The View mentioned Classmates.com as having more than 40 million members in the United States and Canada.

According to the Online Publishers Association Paid Content U.S. Market Spending Report, Classmates.com was Number 4 among the Top 25 Web Destinations Ranked by Consumer Content Revenue in both 2002 and 2003 (the last years that individual site rankings were broken out).  As more users have moved to Facebook, the site has fallen in popularity. Classmates.com was one of the first social networks. However, its habit of continuously charging customers with small fees prevented it from reaching the scale and popularity of later social sites.

As of 2015 (the year the company turned 20), Classmates had over 70 million current members.

Privacy
Classmates.com members use real names, not screen names (although some members use a fake name).  Member privacy is protected through a double-blind email system, so email addresses and contact information are never revealed unless self-disclosed by members one-on-one.

Registering and networking
It is free to register as a basic member of Classmates.com. Basic members can:
 Create profiles and search the entire social networking service for friends
 Get emails about people they have never met visiting their profile,
Classmates+ (formerly Gold) members, who pay a fee, may also:
 read and reply to every message in their Classmates Inbox
 see the names of others who have visited their profile
 see who remembers them and how they’re described as being remembered
 receive a discount on yearbook reprints

Digital yearbook collection 
The Classmates website has an online archive of over 300,000 yearbooks, accessible with a free Classmates membership.

The oldest yearbook currently in the collection is the 1885 yearbook from Central High School (Manchester, NH).
Classmates’ yearbook collection includes the yearbooks of many celebrities, which are periodically discovered and featured on the company’s blog.

Reunions 
As of 2015, Classmates members used the website to plan over 350,000 class reunions. Over 5 million members were invited to a reunion that year.

Controversial business practices and legal issues

Membership renewal and cancellation
It is standard practice for Classmates.com to auto-renew memberships at the end of each billing period. In December 2006, when PCWorld field tested several companies to determine how easy or difficult it was to cancel their service, Classmates.com was one of the companies that received their worst rating.

Fraudulent e-mails and settlement
Classmates.com had sent a significant number of emails that told recipients their old friends from school wished to reconnect (and the recipients would need to buy Classmates.com memberships to receive their old friends' contact information). A class action lawsuit was brought against Classmates.com in 2008. The lead plaintiffs in the case were David Catapano and Anthony Michaels. Classmates.com agreed to pay $2.5 million to its users to settle the lawsuit.

Piggybacking and post-transaction marketing
Classmates.com was accused of piggybacking and post-transaction marketing. Parent company United Online earned $70 million from marketing practices under investigation in 2009 by the Senate Commerce Committee involving piggybacking a second credit card transaction with membership to Classmates.com involving a loyalty program.

Settlement on hidden online shopping fees
On August 18, 2010, New York Attorney General Andrew Cuomo announced a settlement with six companies, including Classmates, as part of a probe into the discount club industry. Classmates was among the retailers that agreed to pay $2.1 million toward refunds and consumer education. Under the alleged practice investigated, consumers who completed online purchases were presented with discounts or cash-back offers, and accepting these offers triggered small, easy-to-overlook recurring charges billed to unfamiliar company names. Classmates' share of the settlement amounts to $960,000 and a commitment to end these practices.

See also
 Names Database, owned by Classmates.com

References

External links
 

American social networking websites
Internet properties established in 1995
Person databases
Person databases
2004 mergers and acquisitions
2015 mergers and acquisitions